Up All Night is the third studio album by East 17 and the last to feature the group's entire original lineup. It was released in November 1995. It is notable in that all members of the group made songwriting contributions to the album, although all three singles released were still penned solely by Tony Mortimer.

The album was certified as Platinum in the UK.

Track listing 

Notes
 signifies a producer

Charts

Year-end charts

Certifications

Year-end charts

References

External links 
discogs.com East 17: Up All Night

1995 albums
East 17 albums
London Records albums